The Washington State Gambling Commission is an agency of the government of the State of Washington, founded in 1973 as the state's gaming control board, which is responsible for enforcing gambling laws and regulations. This organization is the second oldest national agency of such a type. The director of Washington State Gambling Commission is Tina Griffin, who has been the director since 2022.

References

External links
Washington State Gambling Commission

Gambling regulators in the United States
Gambling Commission
State law enforcement agencies of Washington (state)
1973 establishments in Washington (state)
Government agencies established in 1973